The Indonesian Employers Association or commonly known as APINDO, is an independent, non-partisan organization of entrepreneurs engaged in the economical sector in Indonesia. The employers organization is headquartered in Jakarta with regional offices across the Indonesian archipelago. The organization works to bargain different issues faced by employers of the country, as well as to bridge the gap by between workers and employers.

History
The organization was founded on January 31, 1952 under the name of the Indonesian Socio-Economic Entrepreneurship Consultative Board (PUSPI). At the APINDO II National Conference in Surabaya, in 1985, PUSPI changed its name to the Indonesian Employers' Association (APINDO). APINDO was recognized in 1975 by Decree of the Minister of Manpower, and mandated by  KADIN, to represent the Employers on issuer related to industrial relations and manpower affairs.

Membership
APINDO membership consists of two types, namely Ordinary Members and Extraordinary Members.
Ordinary Member is a company in the form of a legal entity or not, owned by an individual, an association or a legal entity, both private and state owned, employing workers / laborers by paying wages or other forms of compensation.
Extraordinary Members are certain companies both on a National or International scale that are registered directly with the National Board or Leadership and / or the Provincial Leadership Council.

See also
List of employer associations
Indonesian Chamber of Commerce and Industry

References

Organizations based in Jakarta

Labor relations
Organizations established in 1952
1952 establishments in Indonesia